Leslie Gordon Chandler (1888–1980) was an Australian jeweller, vigneron, bird photographer, writer and speaker on natural history, and ornithologist.  He became a member of the Royal Australasian Ornithologists Union (RAOU) in 1911 and was Press Correspondent for the RAOU 1914-1916 and again in 1920, war service and disability intervening.  From 1920 he was based at Red Cliffs in the Victorian Mallee region.  He was instrumental in the establishment of the Hattah-Kulkyne National Park there.

Early life 
Leslie Chandler (always known as 'Les') was born on January 11, 1888, in the Melbourne suburb of Malvern, fourth child of English-born parents Robert Charles Chandler and Ellen, née Mead(e)s, moving with his family to The Basin in the Dandenong Ranges where he was schooled locally. Later attending Bayswater State School, his love of nature was inspired as he walked nearly  each day to school through the towering forests of the Dandenong Ranges on the outskirts of Melbourne, often making long detours to observe.

Ornithology and photography 
 

Chandler was apprenticed at fifteen years old to a city jeweller and following his greatest interest began to give nature studies presentations in schools from age eighteen. By 1907 he had taken up bird photography, joining the Bird Observers’ Club in 1908, of which he was once secretary, the Royal Australasian Ornithologists’ Union in 1911 on which he served as Press Secretary, and the Field Naturalists’ Club of Victoria in 1914. His experience as an apprentice jeweler enabled his production of hundreds of harmless bands for the Bird Observers Club and Australasian Ornithologists Union to track birds in the first of such projects in Australia; of Short-tailed Shearwaters on Phillip Island and White-faced Storm-Petrels on Mud Islands during 1912–14.

Staying with Charles Thompson, the owner of Kulkyne Station he came to love the Mallee district, where he was later to settle.

Writer on natural history 
Periodicals including The Emu, Walkabout, Riverlander, Wild Life, Wildlife in Australia, Victorian Naturalist, Australasian Photo-Review, The School Magazine, and Victorian School-paper published Chandler's copious writings and pictures, as did newspapers The Age, Australasian, Argus, Leader, and as ‘Oriole’ he was nature correspondent for the Sunraysia Daily. Whenever he had the time he would spend it in the field, sometimes for several days at a time, to make his observations, employing portable bird hides of hessian, and often climbing high into trees to get his pictures.

His texts are often cited in current ornithological papers, with Woinarski and Recher for example noting the value of his observations, remarking that "Weather conditions following fire also influence bird responses, with Chandler (1973) noting that drought post-fire may accentuate the fire impact. Chandler's observation is astute and it is difficult to separate the effects of drought from that of fire as most wildfires tend to occur during dry periods"

WW1 service 
Chandler signed up with the Australian Imperial Force on 8 July 1915, taking his camera with him to the Western Front, despite photography there being banned. Bayonet training at Seymour Army Camp persuaded him that “he couldn't kill anybody, just couldn't face that,” as his daughter Mary remembered. He volunteered instead as a stretcher-bearer in the 15th Field Ambulance, in which he served on the Western Front, in Egypt, and Belgium. Despite photography being an activity forbidden to Australian soldiers, Chandler recorded lighter moments, the French people and what was left of the natural landscape and used a bulb release to include himself in the picture.

Gassed at Villers-Bretonneux, France, in April 1918, he was invalided to the United Kingdom where he managed to photograph views of the English countryside. Arriving in Melbourne in January 1919 he was discharged medically unfit on 25 July, too ill to resume his trade as a jeweler. While convalescing he founded and led excursions of the Nature Photographers’ Club of Australia in 1919 which contributed and shared their work via a portfolio circulated by mail.

Soldier-settler in the Mallee 
To continue his recovery, Chandler went ‘on holiday’ in the Mallee, recording his impressions in his diary, from which he quotes in a 1947 Walkabout article on the settlement of Red Cliffs, near Mildura;The writer arrived at Red Cliffs in February, 1921, to take up work with a clearing gang and to gain initial knowledge in the surrounding, older settlements of vineyard work, before applying for a block. It was a scorching day of 115 degrees in the shade, with red dust flying, and on the previous day the heat had reached 119 degrees [48ºC].As a soldier-settler under the Victorian Government's “Act to make provision for the Settlement of Discharged Soldiers on the Land and for other purposes” of 22 October 1917, Chandler was granted an allotment of Crown Land of Mallee scrub which he cleared and fenced to create a vineyard for the production of dried sultana grapes and an orchard. A government loan of £500 (worth about $35,000.00 in 2021) on which interest was to be paid, provided the initial capital for returned servicemen, though the land they farmed was what was left over in a largely settled Victoria. On repayment of the initial investment, a further £500 could be granted provided the farming was successful, especially tough in the Mallee where success came only where there was irrigation.

In addition to working to establishing his vineyard and a rudimentary canvas-roofed dwelling, Chandler wrote and photographed for Bush Charms, and Jacky the Butcher-Bird, both published 1922 and very early examples of children's books illustrated with photographs. The latter was reviewed in Table Talk, and The Queenslander notes that “Messrs. Whitcombe and Tombs, Ltd. have published a really choice selection of Australian nature story readers, including...”Jacky, the Butcher Bird," by L. G. Chandler...all thoroughly tested Australian stories, as Australian as the gum tree, and the cheap, well-printed re print brings them within the reach of everybody.”

In addition to making photographs many of his activities, often making self-portraits with a bulb release, from 1900 Chandler kept a life-long diary in shorthand. There, and in articles he wrote, he expresses sympathy for the plight of indigenous peoples of the region in which he settled; "In those early days before the white man came, the blacks little thought that their hunting-grounds that stretched away from the river into the forests of pine, belar, mallee-gums, sugar-wood and other vegetation, would be taken from them and one day cleared…". He had come to love the Mallee before the war, being guided around it by aboriginal princess Mary Woorlong (1879-1942) a Latji Latji or Muthi Muthi woman and daughter of King Wyrlong, a Muthi Muthi from the Euston area, descendants of Mungo Man, and who worked as a domestic servant. He learned much from her and made her portrait, and after her death was instrumental in marking her grave at Mildura Cemetery with a headstone. His 1935 Walkabout article details evidence of Aboriginal occupation in north-west Victoria in kitchen-middens, and trees from which canoes, coolamons and shields have been cut and the method used to trap codfish under trees.

Conservationist 

Naturalists Donald Macdonald and Charles Barrett, and later his work with E. Brooke Nicholls and bird photographer Arthur Mattingley, influenced Chandler. He was a foundation member of the Mildura Historical Society in 1949 and, with the late Reverend C. L. Lang, formed the Sunraysia Naturalists' Club (now the Sunraysia Naturalists' Research Trust) being variously its president, Vice-president, Secretary, Treasurer and Editor. They agitated to have the Hattah-Kulkyne area declared a National Park, with success coming in 1960.

Personal life 
Among Chandler's friends were poet C. J. Dennis, literary patron Jack Moir, cartoonist Hal Gye, sculptor Web Gilbert and painter Tom Roberts.

He married Ivy Henshall at St Andrew's Presbyterian Church, Mordialloc, Victoria, 10 September 1931 and their daughter Mary was born in 1937. Mary Chandler, who died 2020, was an historian and writer whose publications include her edited volume of her father's letters Dear homefolks : letters written by L.G. Chandler during the First World War and of chronicles of their home town, Against the odds : the story of the Red Cliffs settlement, and of environmental history in Tribal lands to national park, with pictures by her father, on the Hattah/Kulkyne National Park.

Chandler sold his vineyard in 1956 and moved to Red Cliffs where he died on 25 January 1980.

Awards 
 1950 Australasian Photo-Review Recognition Medal
 1961 Honorary Life Membership Royal Australasian Ornithologists Union
 Honorary Life Member, Sunraysia Naturalists' Research Trust

Publications

Books

Journal articles
Chandler published hundreds of articles and photographs, in addition to his books.
 

 
 
 
 
 
 
 
 
 
 
 
 
 
 
 
 
 
 
 
 
 
 
 
 Chandler, L.G. (1965). "Eileen Ramsay’s story – four years after." Riverlander November 1965, 8–9.

Exhibitions 
 2021 Soldier Settler, Magnet Galleries, Melbourne
 2021 Mildura Arts Centre joint show with work of Eileen Ramsay, to 25 April (Anzac Day).
 2016 Grief and Glory inclusion, Magnet Galleries, Melbourne
 1932 Bolton Camera Club Annual International Exhibition of Pictorial and Scientific Photography, April 2 - April 9,
 1931 Seventy-sixth Annual Exhibition of The Royal Photographic Society of Great Britain, September 12 - October 10,
 1930 Seventy-fifth Annual Exhibition of The Royal Photographic Society of Great Britain, September 13 - October 11,
 1929 Pacific International Salon of Photographic Art, September 18–28,
 1929 Pacific International Salon of Photographic Art, October 5–15,
 1929 Seventy-fourth Annual Exhibition of the Royal Photographic Society of Great Britain, September 14 - October 12,
 1929 Second International Invitation Salon of the Camera Club of New York, May 1–15, June 6–30, May 16 - June 5, 1929
 1928 Seventy-third Annual Exhibition of the Royal Photographic Society of Great Britain, September 17 - October 13

Bibliography
Robin, Libby. (2001). The Flight of the Emu: a hundred years of Australian ornithology 1901-2001. Carlton, Vic. Melbourne University Press.

See also 
Further biographical details for Les Chandler appear in H. M. Whittell's The Literature of Australian Birds

References 

1888 births
1980 deaths
Australian ornithologists
Australian naturalists
Australian photographers
Australian conservationists
Australian children's book illustrators
Australian jewellers
20th-century Australian zoologists
Scientists from Melbourne
People from the City of Knox
Writers from Melbourne
Military personnel from Melbourne
Australian military personnel of World War I
Australian people of English descent
World War I photographers